City Hunters is an animated TV series developed in Argentina that premiered throughout Latin America in October 2006 on the Fox network. The series, which blends traditional animation techniques with the latest generation of CGI, consists of nine 11-minute episodes.

City Hunters is a form of branded entertainment. It was co-produced by Unilever for the AXE  brand.

The animated series follows the antics of an aging Casanova, Dr. Lynch, and the young man he's training in the art of seducing women. The series was created by Catmandu Branded Entertainment, a branded entertainment firm headquartered in Buenos Aires, Argentina and produced by Encuadre. The characters were developed by Italian illustrator Milo Manara and aired in English.

City Hunters airs on Fox Latin America's adult-skewed block "No Molestar" (Spanish-speaking countries; in Brazil, "Não Perturbe", both meaning "Do Not Disturb"), which includes Futurama, The Simpsons, Family Guy, and American Dad!.

The first episode was supervised by Carlos Baeza and most of the episodes were directed by Diego Pernia, Victor Ahmed and Gustavo Cova.

List of episodes
"Mahatma Dandy"
"Mutiny"
"Who's Your Momma"
"Wingman"
"Simultaneous Matches"
"Count Lynch"
"Sextopia"
"Final Fantasy"
"The Phantom Menace"

Sources
 Advertising Age, October 9, 2006 Issue
 article on Variety.com
 Fox article on City Hunters link is 404

External links

2006 Argentine television series debuts
2006 Argentine television series endings
2000s Argentine television series
Argentine adult animated drama television series
Fox Broadcasting Company original programming
Television series by 20th Century Fox Television